The 2003-04 season is the eighth in the history of the Glasgow Warriors as a professional side. During this season the young professional side competed as Glasgow Rugby.

The 2003-04 season saw Glasgow Rugby compete in the competitions: the Celtic League; the European Challenge Cup, the Parker Pen Challenge Cup for sponsorship reasons; and the inaugural Celtic Cup.

Season Overview

Team

Coaches

Head coach:  Hugh Campbell 
Assistant coach:  Shade Munro
Assistant coach:  Sean Lineen

Staff

Chairman: George Blackie
Chief executive: David Jordan
Media Manager: Bill McMurtrie
Team Facilitator: Dougie Mills
Sales & Marketing Executive: Gordon Hood
Administration Manager: Diane Murphy
Team doctor: Gerry Haggerty
Physiotherapists: Bob Stewart, Fiona Shanks

Squad

Academy players

Glasgow had a number of academy players this season. Each player was teamed with a mentor.

Alan Auld (wing/full back, Grangemouth) with Sean Lamont
Cameron McCulloch (full back/stand-off, Hillhead/Jordanhill) with Stuart Moffat
Greig Sinclair (full back, Allan Glen's) with Rory Kerr
Fraser Duguid (outside centre, Dalziel) with Alan Bulloch
Iain Kennedy (inside centre, GHA) with Joe Naufahu
Alistair Miller (scrum-half, GHA) with Sam Pinder
Andrew Reekie (prop, Hutchesons' Grammar School) with Matt Proudfoot
Willie Brown (prop, Hillhead/Jordanhill) with Lee Harrison
Bobby Agnew (prop, Hillhead/Jordanhill) with Euan Murray
Andrew Noble (hooker, Whitecraigs) with Simon Gunn
Donald Malcolm (hooker, GHA) with Scott Lawson
Chris Love (flanker, West Of Scotland) with Andrew Wilson
James Eddie (lock/flanker, GHA) with Andrew Hall
Stuart Rose (flanker, Hillhead/Jordanhill) with Donnie Macfadyen
Blake Whitehead (No.8, Dalziel) with Rory McKay
Calum Forrester (No.8, Hutchesons' Grammar School) with Paul Dearlove

Back up players

Glasgow also had a roll of back-up players from various clubs:

Player statistics

During the 2003–04 season, Glasgow have used 36 different players in competitive games. The table below shows the number of appearances and points scored by each player.

Staff movements

Coaches
Head Strength Coach – Ross Macleod

Personnel In

None.

Personnel Out

None.

Player movements

Academy promotions

Player transfers

In

Out

Competitions

Pre-season and friendlies

Match 1

Glasgow: Alan Bulloch, Calvin Howarth, Sean Lamont, Gareth Maclure, Mark McMillan, David Millard, Stuart Moffat, Graeme Morrison, Joe Naufahu, Sam Pinder, Colin Shaw, Kenny Sinclair, Jon Steel, Joe Beardshaw, Alan Brown, Paul Dearlove, Simon Gunn, Andrew Hall, Andrew Kelly, Scott Lawson, Donnie Macfadyen, Cameron Mather, Rory McKay, Eric Milligan, Euan Murray, Matt Proudfoot, Roland Reid, Nathan Ross and Andrew Wilson.

Gloucester:

Match 2

Glasgow: Stuart Moffat; Gareth Maclure, Graeme Morrison, Alan Bulloch, Sean Lamont; Calvin Howarth, Sam Pinder; Euan Murray, Simon Gunn, Matt Proudfoot, Andrew Hall, Nathan Ross, Cameron Mather (captain), Donnie Macfadyen, Paul Dearlove. Replacements – Joe Beardshaw, Lee Harrison, Andrew Kelly, Scott Lawson, Rory McKay, David Millard, Roland Reid, Kenny Sinclair, Jon Steel, Andrew Wilson.

Newcastle: J Shaw; A Cadwallader, M Shaw, M Mayerhofler, M Stephenson; B Gollings, H Charlton; M Ward, M Thompson, M Hurter, J Parling, C Hamilton, E Taione, W Britz, H Vyvyan. Replacements used: J Grindall, N Makin, T May, I Peel, O Phillips, S Richardson, M Wilkinson, D Wilson, B Woods

Match 3

Scotland U21: Brian Archibald (Stirling County); Nick De Luca (Heriot's), Alan Nash (Watsonians), Iain Berthinussen (Gala), Colin Shaw (Glasgow Hawks); Andy McLean (Gala), Brendan McKerchar (Melrose) captain; Robert Blake (Birmingham University), Fergus Thomson (Glasgow Hawks and Scottish Institute of Sport), Willie Aitken (Peebles), Peter Wilmshurst-Smith (Gloucester), Colin White (Stirling County), Alasdair Strokosch (Boroughmuir and Scottish Institute of Sport), Grant Strang (Aberdeen GSFP), Mark Cairns (Loughborough University).
Replacements – Calum Brown (Boroughmuir), John Cox (Boroughmuir), Mark Hunter (Stirling County), Stuart Johnson (Melrose), Jonathan White (Heriot's and Scottish Institute of Sport), Neil Cochrane (Watsonians), Richard Snedden (Boroughmuir), Stephen Gordon (Glasgow Hawks and Scottish Institute of Sport), Stephen Jones (Newcastle Falcons)

Glasgow: Glenn Metcalfe (captain); David Millard, David Arneil (Heriot's), Joe Naufahu, Rory Couper (Boroughmuir); Colin Gregor (Watsonians), Sam Pinder; Mark Thomson (Kirkcaldy), Simon Gunn, Matt Proudfoot, Fergus Pringle (Hawick), John Stewart (Stirling County), Andrew Wilson, Paul Dearlove, Olly Brown (Boroughmuir).
Replacements – Graham Kiddie (Boroughmuir), Alan Bulloch, Kenny Sinclair, Jamie Syme (Heriot's), Roland Reid, Ian Dryburgh (Watsonians), Chris Sinclair (Heriot's), Danny Wright (Watsonians), Jamie Fowlie (Forrester).

European Challenge Cup

Results

Round 1

Round 2

Glasgow Warriors lost on aggregate and were knocked out of the Challenge Cup.

Celtic League

League table

Results

Round 1

Round 2

Round 3

Round 4

Round 5

Round 6

Round 7

Round 8

Round 9

Round 10

Round 11

Round 12

Round 13

Round 14

Round 15

Round 16

Round 17

Round 18

Round 19

Round 20

Round 21

Round 22

Celtic Cup

Results

Round 1

Quarter-final

Semi-final

End-of-season awards

References

2003-04
Glasgow
Glasgow
Glasgow